Historic Sportscar Racing (HSR) is an automobile club and sanctioning body that supports historic racing in the United States. The organization traces its roots to the first running of the Walter Mitty Challenge in 1977 at Road Atlanta. HSR continues to sanction the Mitty, along with six to 10 other events each year. The organization has been owned by the International Motor Sports Association (IMSA) since January 2022.

Events and venues

The organization sanctions races on the East Coast and Canada. Annual events include:
 Rolex Monterey Motorsports Reunion at WeatherTech Raceway Laguna Seca
 Classic 24 Hours of Daytona presented by IMSA at Daytona International Speedway
 Classic 12 Hours of Sebring at Sebring International Raceway
 Classic 6 Hours of Watkins Glen at Watkins Glen International
 The Mitty at Road Atlanta
 Atlanta Fall Historics at Road Atlanta

References

External links
 Official website
 Gallery of HSR races 2016-present
 Classic 24 Hours of Daytona official website

Historic motorsport events
Auto racing organizations in the United States